Yamato "Matt" Ishida, known as  in Japan, is a fictional character from the Digimon multimedia franchise, appearing in Digimon Adventure, Digimon Adventure 02, Digimon Adventure tri., and Digimon Adventure: Last Evolution Kizuna. First appearing in the 1999 film Digimon Adventure, Matt is one of the DigiDestined, a group of children chosen to save the Digital World, and is partnered with Gabumon.

Matt has consistently ranked as top favorite DigiDestined character by Japanese voters, and critics cite his relationships with T.K. Takaishi and Tai Kamiya as one of the strongest and most memorable parts of the series. Outside of the series, several CD singles have been released under Matt's bands, Teen-age Wolves and Knife of Day.

Development
Matt was designed by Katsuyoshi Nakatsuru. After picking out Tai's name with an analysis software, Satoru Nishizono and the other staff members did the same for Matt and the rest of the characters, choosing kanji that related to "luck." While Digimon Adventure 02 was in development, the show's staff discussed the idea of Matt breaking from the DigiDestined and joining the enemy side. For Digimon Adventure tri., Matt's appearance was designed by Atsuya Uki. Keitaro Motonaga stated that the staff focused on Matt's rivalry with Tai to show how much their views have changed as they matured.

In Japan, Matt was voiced by Yūto Kazama, who had originally auditioned for Joe Kido and Gabumon. Despite Kazama's reluctance to voice a "pretty boy" character, Hiroyuki Kakudo had selected him for the role instantly. Kazama described Matt as a "surprisingly passionate guy" who he was later able to relate to, and that he really cared about friendship. Furthermore he and Gabumon's voice actress, Mayumi Yamaguchi, felt that Matt's introspective views on friendship were best represented in their duet, "Ore-tachi no Melody." Aside from providing Matt's voice, Kazama also provided the bass instrumental for his theme song in Digimon Adventure 02, "Negai Kanaeru Kagi." In Digimon Adventure tri., Yoshimasa Hosoya provided his voice. Hosoya mentioned that he faced pressure and was concerned about his performance due to concerns coming from the change in cast, especially when he was asked to perform the ending theme to the third movie as Matt. He also cited that as the oldest of the new cast, he took great care in portraying Yamato's "youth" as a high school student.

In the English version, the character's name was shortened to "Matt" from "Yamato." Jeff Nimoy, one of the screenwriters, noted that if he could change anything about Matt, it would be about his indecisiveness, as he had trouble adapting the scene where he confronts his feelings with Gabumon. Michael Reisz provided his voice in Digimon Adventure and Digimon Adventure 02. In tri., Vic Mignogna replaced him, with the voice director mentioning that his voice resembled Reisz's. Mignogna described Matt as a "loner" trying to find out where he "fits in", attributing his insecurities to his parents' divorce.

Appearances

Anime
Matt first made a brief appearance in the 1999 film Digimon Adventure. He becomes part of the main cast of Digimon Adventure, where he, along with six other children, are transported to the Digital World, later learning that they are "DigiDestined" and were chosen to save both worlds. Another distinctive trait of Matt is that he carries a harmonica with him at all times, which he sometimes plays.

In his daily life, Matt is a 5th grade student who attends the same elementary school as the other DigiDestined. He lives in Odaiba with his father, Hiroaki Ishida, after his parents divorced three years prior. Because of this, he develops an awkward relationship with his mother, Nancy Takaishi, as he feels they treat each other as strangers, and he is protective of his younger brother, T.K. Takaishi. Throughout the series, Matt's caution in the Digital World, especially in regards to T.K.'s safety, leads him to clash with Tai often, due to the latter's recklessness. While fighting the Dark Masters, Matt begins fearing T.K. will grow apart from him, which culminates into a violent altercation with Tai, and he withdraws from the DigiDestined after doubting his importance. He later rejoins them after realizing he values his friendships with them, particularly Tai.

In Digimon Adventure 02, Matt is a second-year middle school student who becomes a mentor to the younger generation of DigiDestined. He forms a band with his classmates called the Teen-age Wolves and provides lead vocals and bass.

In Digimon Adventure tri., Matt is a second-year high school student at Tsukishima High School. He provides lead vocals and bass to Knife of Day after the Teen-age Wolves disbands. Throughout the series, he acts as Tai's foil and questions his reluctance to fight. When the DigiDestined believe Tai to be dead in Coexistence, Matt takes on his responsibility as a leader and rallies the DigiDestined until Tai returns, even wearing Tai's goggles during this time.

After the events of the series, Digimon Adventure 02'''s epilogue depicts Matt and Gabumon becoming astronauts. He marries Sora Takenouchi and they have two children: a daughter with a Yokomon and a son with a Tsunomon.

In other media

Matt has also appeared in several video games from the Digimon franchise, including Digimon Adventure: Anode/Cathode Tamer. He is a playable character in video game adaptation of Digimon Adventure.

In Japan, several image songs were released under Matt's name. "Walk on the Edge" was performed by Yūto Kazama and released on March 24, 2000 on the compilation CD album Digimon Adventure: Best Hit Parade. For Digimon Adventure 02, a character CD single was released on June 21, 2000 under Matt's name and contained his theme song,  and a duet with Gabumon titled . Kazama had also provided the bass instrumental for "Negai Kanaeru Kagi." In addition to Matt's character songs,  was released as a single under Matt's band, Teen-age Wolves, on April 4, 2001. The CD also contained an audio drama focusing on Matt, where he receives a letter from a fan who is about to undergo eye surgery.

For Digimon Adventure tri., Yoshimasa Hosoya performed the song  as Matt, which served as the ending theme song to the third movie, Confession. The single was released under Matt's band, Knife of Day, on September 21, 2016, and contained the song "Which" as a B-side. Hosoya had described that, while the lyrics were kept general, "Boku ni Totte" is Yamato's message to Gabumon, while "Which" was about finding oneself. To promote "Boku ni Totte", a music video was released on August 12, 2016. The single peaked at #46 on Oricon's Weekly Singles Chart. The song was later re-released and rearranged as Matt's theme song on the compilation album Digimon Adventure tri. Character Songs: DigiDestined version on April 10, 2017, which peaked at #74 on the Oricon Weekly Charts.

Matt is portrayed by Shohei Hashimoto in the 2.5D musical stage play, Digimon Adventure tri.: The Adventure on August 1st. Hashimoto, who had watched Digimon Adventure when he was young, cited Matt as his favorite character and stated that his "cool" personality had not changed when he had grown up. To prepare for the role, Hashimoto had to learn how to play the harmonica.

Critical reception

On Toei Animation's Digimon website, Matt was ranked #1 by Japanese voters as their favorite DigiDestined three times. In the final poll, he ranked #2. Matt was also ranked #1 by Japanese voters as the person they would want as a lover.

Matt's character development has been cited as one of the more memorable parts of Digimon Adventure, with Brian Camp and Julie Davis mentioning in Anime Classics Zettai! that his relationship with T.K. was one of the "refreshing" examples of how older children regard the younger ones. Jacob Hope Chapman from Anime News Network noted that Matt's family background resonated with audiences from separated families and believed his struggles with abandonment resulting from that led to personal differences with Tai frequently. Similarly, Melissa Sternenberg from THEM Anime Reviews found the rivalry between Tai and Matt interesting, citing that both of them are similar for being worried about their younger siblings.

For Digimon Adventure tri., critics from Anime News Network and DVDTalk mentioned that Matt and Tai's arguments brought enjoyment and a sense of familiarity to the audience who grew up with the series.
 Reception towards Vic Mignogna's portrayal of Matt was met with criticism, with Jacob Hope Chapman from Anime News Network citing his distinctive voice and extensive voice acting resume as the reason. Chapman also described "Boku ni Totte" as "super-melancholy." In a review to Our Future, Shamus Kelley from Den of Geek!'' found Matt and Gabumon's conversation one of the "bright spots" of the film that explored the relationships between the DigiDestined and their Digimon partners.

See also
 List of Digimon Adventure characters

Notes

References

Child characters in anime and manga
Child characters in film
Digimon
Fictional Japanese people in anime and manga
Television characters introduced in 1999
Male characters in anime and manga
Teenage characters in anime and manga
Teenage characters in film
Fictional elementary school students
Fictional middle school students
Fictional high school students